Cauet is a French surname. Notable people with the surname include:

 Benoît Cauet (born 1969), French footballer
 Sébastien Cauet (born 1972), French radio and television presenter, DJ, comedian, and singer

French-language surnames